Radek Vondráček (born 30 December 1973) is a Czech lawyer and politician who had been Speaker of the Chamber of Deputies of the Czech Republic from 2017 to 2021. 

He previously served as First Deputy Speaker of the Chamber of Deputies from January 2017 to October 2017. Vondráček was first elected Member of the Chamber of Deputies (MP) in 2013 and again re-elected at the October 2017 election. Vondráček is member of the movement ANO 2011.

Life
He graduated from the Faculty of Law of Masaryk University in Brno. From 2000 to 2003 he worked as an articled clerk in the law office of JUDr. Ján Halás in Kroměříž. Since then he has been a solicitor. He is married and has two children.

Political career 
In the elections to the Chamber of Deputies of the Parliament of the Czech Republic in 2013 he stood as a leader of the ANO 2011 movement as a non-party in the Zlín Region and was elected. [1] From 5 December 2013, he held the position of Vice-Chairman of the Assembly's Constitutional and Legal Committee. [2] On 11 January 2017, he was elected the first Deputy Speaker of the Chamber of Deputies of the Parliament of the Czech Republic when Jaroslava Pokorná Jermanová resigned from office at the beginning of the month. He received 106 votes from the Members present. [3] He held the post until October 2017.

In the municipal elections in 2014 he was elected representative of the city of Kroměříž for the ANO 2011 movement. [4] In November 2014, he also became a deputy mayor of the city. In December 2017, he also resigned from the mandate of the city representative.

In the elections to the Chamber of Deputies of the Parliament of the Czech Republic in 2017 he was the leader of ANO 2011 in the Zlín Region. [7] He received 4,687 preferential votes and defended his mandate. [8]

On 22 November 2017 he was elected Speaker of the Chamber of Deputies of the Parliament of the Czech Republic, gaining 135 votes. 197 votes were collected, 14 votes were cast, two votes were invalid and 46 other members did not cast their votes. [9]

In mid-February 2019, at the Fifth Assembly of the ANO 2011 Movement, he first received the post of vice-chairman of this movement (186 out of 237 delegates voted in favor) [10].

References 

1973 births
Living people
Speakers of the Chamber of Deputies (Czech Republic)
People from Kroměříž
ANO 2011 MPs
Masaryk University alumni
Members of the Chamber of Deputies of the Czech Republic (2013–2017)
Members of the Chamber of Deputies of the Czech Republic (2017–2021)
Members of the Chamber of Deputies of the Czech Republic (2021–2025)